Ernest Holmes (14 February 1918 – 2 March 1987) was a South African cricketer. He played in two first-class matches for Border in 1939/40.

See also
 List of Border representative cricketers

References

External links
 

1918 births
1987 deaths
South African cricketers
Border cricketers